The 1994 Six Nations Tournament was the first playing of the Six Nations ice hockey Tournament. A total of 29 teams participated in the qualifying rounds, and the tournament was won by HC Bolzano.

Qualification round

Atlantic League

1994–95 Alpenliga season

Danube League

Adriatic League

Final tournament

Semifinals

Group A

Group B

Final
December 6, 1994, in Rouen : Dragons de Rouen - HC Bolzano 5–7
December 8, 1994, in Bolzano : HC Bolzano - Dragons de Rouen 5–3

External links
1994 tournament on hockeyarchives.info

Six
Six Nations Tournament (ice hockey)